Jon D. Sandusky (born February 21, 1977) is a former executive in the National Football League (NFL). He was the director of pro personnel for the Philadelphia Eagles from 2008 to 2009, and the director of player personnel for the Cleveland Browns from 2010 to 2014.

Coaching career
Sandusky served as an intern for the Penn State football team for two years.

Executive career

Philadelphia Eagles
Sandusky joined the Philadelphia Eagles in 2001 as an intern in the personnel department. He became a pro scout the following year, and served in that capacity from 2002 to 2008, before being promoted to director of pro personnel on June 10, 2008.

Cleveland Browns
Sandusky was hired by the Cleveland Browns as the director of player personnel on January 20, 2010, after former Eagles general manager Tom Heckert was hired in Cleveland. He was demoted to player personnel associate in 2014, and the Browns "parted ways" with him on May 18, 2015.

Personal
Sandusky was arrested in October 2013 for driving under the influence.

He is the son of convicted serial child rapist and former Penn State assistant football coach Jerry Sandusky.

References

External links
 Cleveland Browns bio

1977 births
Living people
American adoptees
Penn State Nittany Lions football players
Philadelphia Eagles executives
Cleveland Browns executives
People from State College, Pennsylvania
People from Centre County, Pennsylvania
Players of American football from Pennsylvania